Tomasz Marek Motyka (born 8 May 1981 in Wrocław) is a Polish épée fencer.

European champion in 2005, he won a silver medal in Men's Team Épée at the 2008 Summer Olympics in Beijing, together with Adam Wiercioch, Radosław Zawrotniak, and Robert Andrzejuk. For his sport achievements, he received the Golden Cross of Merit in 2008.

References
 sports-reference
 Profile at the European Fencing Confederation

1981 births
Living people
Polish male épée fencers
Fencers at the 2008 Summer Olympics
Olympic fencers of Poland
Olympic silver medalists for Poland
Sportspeople from Wrocław
Medalists at the 2008 Summer Olympics
Olympic medalists in fencing
20th-century Polish people
21st-century Polish people